The Museum of the Liberation of Rome is located in an apartment building at Via Tasso 145, Rome, close to the basilica of St. John Lateran. It records the period of German occupation of Rome (September 1943 - June 1944) in the Second World War  and its subsequent liberation. The building housing the museum was used by the SS to torture members of the Italian Resistance in the first half of 1944.

History 
Following completion of the building in the late 1930s, it was rented to the German Embassy in Rome and initially used as that embassy's Cultural Office. The headquarters of the Sicherheitspolizei (SiPo), an agency of the SS, led by Herbert Kappler, were established there from 11 September 1943 and occupied the building until the German retreat from Rome. Under Kappler it was transformed into a prison, with the rooms being turned into cells. In January 1944 all windows were walled up to facilitate imprisonment, interrogations and torture of some of the most important figures of the Italian resistance, with an estimated 2000 people passing through the building. On 4 June 1944, the day of the Liberation of Rome, the population entered the building and freed those prisoners who had not been taken and subsequently murdered by the retreating SS.

Following donation of the apartments occupied by the SS to the Italian State in 1950 the museum was established to record the period of German occupation and Rome's subsequent liberation. The donation, by Princess Josepha Ruspoli in Savorgnan di Brazzà, specifically required the rooms to be used as a museum for that purpose. After an initial opening of a few rooms in 1955 by the Italian President Giovanni Gronchi, it was definitively opened in 1957. Sources of materials for the exhibition included Gestapo files and documents provided by the people of Rome, particularly those associated with the resistance. On the night between 22 and 23 November 1999 there was an explosion outside the museum that caused some slight damage. This attempt was believed to have been anti-Semitic in nature. On the following 8 December, 3500 people demonstrated outside the museum in solidarity. In 2007, the nearby metro station of Manzoni was renamed Manzoni - Museo della Liberazione in honour of the museum.

The museum 
The museum occupies three floors. In addition to recording the torture that took place on the site, it details the persecution of Rome's Jews, with copies of newspaper reports and posters imposing bans and anti-Jewish orders. It also covers the underground struggle, exhibiting manifestos and handbills of the resistance. It provides information about those imprisoned in Via Tasso and pays particular attention to the Ardeatine Massacre when some of the 335 victims were taken from the prisons of Via Tasso. In some of the cells writings in pencil on the plaster and other graffiti provide touching messages of life and freedom, often written by prisoners nearing death.

The rooms 
 Ground floor
In addition to the reception area the ground floor has a conference room and a library, which is particularly devoted to the resistance and contains a large number of rare pamphlets and newspapers related to the period.
 First floor
This contains five cells. Cell 1, the largest, concerns the Ardeatine Massacre. Cell 2 was used for solitary confinement. This, and one on the upper floor, was not covered with wallpaper and displays evidence of messages scratched in the plaster by the prisoners. Cell 3 is devoted to Forte Bravetta, a location on Rome's Janiculum that was used by the Germans for executions, and to the people who died there. Cell 4 remembers the 14 prisoners taken by the SS when they retreated from Rome, and their execution at La Storta on 4 June 1944. Cell 5 was a kitchen converted into an isolation unit. It contains the white flag used by Roman officials in negotiating an ”open city” status with Marshal Kesselring, commander of the German forces in Italy.

 Second floor

This has 5 cells with exhibitions, in two apartments. Cell 11 contains posters that give orders to and impose restrictions on the population. Cell 12 is the second isolation cell that contains scratched messages from the prisoners. Cell 13 displays newspapers and other memories of the resistance. This display is continued in Cell 14, which also contains the Italian flag raised on the Capitoline Hill in Rome on the day of Liberation. In the second apartment, the one exhibition room records the arrest by the SS of 1259 Jewish citizens from the Roman Ghetto in October 1943.

 Third floor
Cell number 12 is the isolation cell and shows graffiti scratched on the wall by J.Lloyd of the British Army with a picture of a Union Jack planted on a hill.

References

Bibliography 
 Fabio Simonetti, Via Tasso: Quartier generale e carcere tedesco durante l’occupazione di Roma, Odradek, Roma, 2016.

External links

Tourist attractions in Rome
Museums in Rome
World War II museums in Italy